Robert Douglas Bullock (July 10, 1929 – June 18, 1999), was an American Democratic politician from Texas, whose career spanned four decades. His service culminated in his term as the 38th Lieutenant Governor of Texas from January 15, 1991, to January 19, 1999, during the term of Governor Ann Richards and the first term of Governor George W. Bush.

Early life
Robert Douglas Bullock was born in Hillsboro in Hill County on July 10, 1929, to Ruth Mitchell and Thomas Austin Bullock, a Hillsboro city engineer and manager. Bullock graduated from Hillsboro High School in 1947 and attended Hill College, a junior college, in 1949. He served in the United States Air Force during the Korean War from 1951 to 1954.

Bullock graduated from Texas Tech University with a Bachelor of Arts. He also graduated from Baylor University with a law degree in 1958.

Political career
After Bullock began his career in public service as a member of the Texas House of Representatives, he resigned in October 1959 to practice law and later served as general counsel of the Texas Automobile Dealers Association. He returned to public life when he was appointed Secretary of State of Texas, the state's chief elections and records officer, by Governor Preston Smith. Bullock soon left the post to prepare for a statewide race for state comptroller in the 1974 Democratic primary. Under Texas law, a Secretary of State must resign in order to run for another office, a practice not required in most states. He served for four consecutive four-year terms.

Bullock, before he was widely known, was one of the few Texas Democrats to chastise John Connally for his party switch in 1973. In 1998, Bullock himself would urge the reelection of a Republican, then-Governor Bush.

He was one of the last Democrats to win a statewide election in Texas.

Texas Comptroller of Public Accounts

In 1973, Bullock first sought the Democratic nomination for Comptroller of Public Accounts. The octogenarian incumbent, Robert S. Calvert, soon withdrew from the contest when he gauged Bullock's strength. In November 1974, Bullock won the general election, defeating Republican Nick Rowe, a former Vietnam War prisoner of war. Bullock garnered 1,099,559 votes (71.61%) to Rowe's 419,657 votes (27.33%).

Once sworn in as comptroller in January 1975, Bullock promised to modernize the office. During his sixteen years in office, Bullock pledged fair but aggressive audits. He made statewide headlines with a long series of "raids" on businesses that had collected state taxes from customers for many years but had not turned them in to the state. Bullock had pledged to secure these owed taxes; the officials collecting them were known as "Bullock's Raiders". As an outgrowth of his tax collecting efforts, that term entered the Texas government lexicon.

Bullock was also the first elected state official to adopt an equal opportunity employment program, a policy that Calvert had opposed. Also, Bullock was among the first elected officials to use computer technology in state government to cut costs and improve productivity. He was the winner of numerous national awards for his management skills, including the "Leon Rothenberg Taxpayer Service Award". As comptroller, Bullock's frequent and increasingly accurate forecasts on state finances allowed the legislature to budget more accurately. He also developed a "Taxpayers Bill of Rights" to guarantee fairness, courtesy and common sense.

Bullock was re-elected in 1978 virtually unopposed, garnering 1,288,320 votes (100.00%) since nobody bothered to run against him. In 1982 he defeated Republican Mike Richards, garnering 1,791,650 votes (58.02%) to Richards' 1,245,328 votes (40.33%). In 1986 Bullock had no Republican opponent; he defeated Libertarian George Meeks, garnering 2,416,658 votes (90.02%) to Meeks' 267,872 votes (9.98%).

Although Bullock refused to seek the governorship during the 1980s, he set eyes on the lieutenant governorship when on June 1, 1987, longtime incumbent William P. "Bill" Hobby Jr. of Houston announced that he would not seek a sixth term. Bullock quickly announced his candidacy for lieutenant governor in September 1987.

Lieutenant Governorship

In 1990, Bullock was elected Lieutenant Governor, having defeated the 39-year-old Republican nominee, businessman Robert Mosbacher Jr., of Houston, the son of the sitting United States Secretary of Commerce Robert Mosbacher. Bullock received 2,002,360 votes (51.69 percent) to Mosbacher's 1,741,893 votes (44.97 percent); he took office on January 15, 1991, as Democrat Ann W. Richards became the state's second female governor. In 1994, Bullock was easily elected to a second four-year term over Republican Harold "Tex" Lezar; Bullock received 2,631,843 votes (61.48 percent) to Lezar's 1,648,848 votes (38.52 percent). Bullock was inaugurated for his second term on January 17, 1995, while Republican George W. Bush was sworn in as Texas's 46th governor, having unseated Ann Richards. Bullock did not seek election to a third term in 1998; he was succeeded by Republican Agriculture Commissioner (and later Governor) Rick Perry on January 19, 1999.

Serving as Texas's 38th lieutenant governor, Bullock favored a hands-on management style that resulted in numerous achievements as the presiding officer of the Texas Senate. Bullock overhauled the ethics laws during his first term in an effort to restore public confidence in state government. He created the Texas Performance Review for the state comptroller to analyze spending at state agencies and recommended cost-saving alternatives. He helped consolidate all environmental agencies into one department in an effort to better serve Texans and protecting the state's natural resources. As the state's second-highest elected statewide officeholder, Bullock aggressively pushed through a constitutional amendment requiring voter approval before a state personal income tax could be enacted and requiring the money be earmarked for education, if voters approve the tax. He led efforts to modernize the Texas tax system and worked on state problems in tort reform, health and juvenile justice. Bullock was instrumental in finding a legislative solution to get Texas out of federal court lawsuits involving prisons and mental health. He was a leader in legislative efforts to revamp the state's educational funding system and ushered through a law that created the state's first comprehensive water conservation and management plan. As lieutenant governor, he professed a nonpartisan approach to lawmaking, often telling members of the Texas Senate to leave their politics at the door.

Bullock and Bush got along well, in part because Bullock got to lead an increasingly Republican legislature to agree to key laws and policies and, "when they passed, Bullock and House Speaker Pete Laney allowed Bush to claim some credit." Bullock unofficially endorsed Republican Governor Bush's presidential campaign even before it got off the ground.

At a November 8, 2006, post-election press conference, a reporter from the Austin American-Statesman, who had covered Bush's tenure as governor, asked Bush if he thought then U.S. House Speaker-elect Nancy Pelosi resembled Bullock. The President replied that the reporter's question was an inside joke. The question was a thinly-veiled reference to the close working relationship between Bush and Bullock; the reporter apparently was asking whether Bush would be capable of forging a similar bipartisan relationship with the members of the new Democratic legislative majority in the U.S. Congress.

Bullock was renowned for his blunt and sometimes politically incorrect speaking style, but also for his trademark closing line "God bless Texas". A lover of Texas history, he was instrumental in the establishment of the Texas State History Museum, located just to the north of the State Capitol in Austin. Opened to the public on April 21, 2001 (San Jacinto Day) after Bullock's death, it was named in his honor. The second-floor lobby of the museum features a seven-foot-tall bronze statue of Bullock holding a giant gavel, next to a gallery of items and a video from his career in politics.

His political papers are housed in the Baylor Collection of Political Materials.

Personal life

Bullock's adult life was marred by alcoholism and divorce; he had a total of five marriages, although at least one of them was a repeat. He stopped drinking in 1981 and remained active with Alcoholics Anonymous for the remainder of his life.

He married Amelia J. Hooks of Itasca in 1950 and divorced in 1978. He married Jan Felts Teague of Austin in 1985. He had two children from his first marriage, Lindy Bullock Ward and Robert Douglas "Bobby" Bullock Jr. He also had another daughter from his second marriage, Kimberly Teague.

Death
Bullock died at his home in Austin of cancer on June 18, 1999, and is interred there at the Texas State Cemetery.

Honors
Texas State Highway Loop 20 in Laredo is named the Bob Bullock Loop in his honor. The Laredo Energy Arena is located just off the Bob Bullock Loop. The Texas State History Museum, located a few blocks north of the Capitol Building in Austin, is named to honor Bullock's efforts in the establishment of the facility.

References

External links
 Bob Bullock Story & Papers from Baylor University
 Bullock Gravesite at the Texas State Cemetery in Austin
 Texas State Historical Association Online of Bullock's biography and accomplishments

1929 births
1999 deaths
20th-century American lawyers
20th-century American politicians
Texas lawyers
Democratic Party members of the Texas House of Representatives
Lieutenant Governors of Texas
Secretaries of State of Texas
Comptrollers of Texas
United States Air Force personnel of the Korean War
United States Air Force airmen
People from Hillsboro, Texas
People from Austin, Texas
American Presbyterians
Hill College alumni
Texas Tech University alumni
Baylor University alumni
Baylor Law School alumni
Deaths from cancer in Texas
Burials at Texas State Cemetery